An auto clicker is a type of software or macro that can be used to automate the clicking of a mouse on a computer screen element. Some clickers can be triggered to repeat recorded input.

Auto clickers can be as simple as a program that simulates mouse clicking. This type of auto clicker is fairly generic and will often work alongside any other computer program running at the time and acting as though a physical mouse button is pressed.

More complex auto clickers can similarly be as general, but often are custom-made for use with one particular program and involve memory reading. Such auto clickers may allow the user to automate most or all mouse functions, as well as simulate a full set of keyboard inputs. Custom-made auto clickers may have a narrower scope than a generic auto clicker. Sometimes, an auto clicker may not deliver the amount of clicks as entered because of the limitations of the software it is being used on.

Auto clickers are also called automation software programs, and may have features enabling response conditional reactions, as well as a keyboard.

Applications

An auto clicker has different applications depending upon the type of task required to be automated. Following are a few examples where auto clickers are used.

Software testing: Software testing can be tedious for a human when there are many UI elements that have to be tested repeatedly. In such cases, specialized macros can be created and auto clickers that test the software elements.
Data entry automation: For repetitive data entry operations, an auto clicker can be used to replicate the sequence of operations and automating the process, saving time and with minimal chance of error. More complex data entry operations cannot be automated using an auto clicker.
Gaming: Some gamers use auto clickers to perform game actions such as attacking or shooting automatically, or to accelerate their clicking speed in games like Minecraft, Roblox and various idle games. In some multiplayer games where an auto clicker would give a player an unfair advantage, the software is able to detect the use of an auto clicker and ban the user from playing competitively.

Hardware
Whilst an auto clicker is software that is emulating mouse clicks, there is hardware that can do this for itself. Some computer mice marketed as "gaming mice" sometimes have an autoclicker built-in which will click on a user determined rate. Similarly, some computer joysticks come with an auto-fire function which can usually be adjusted by a further control which sets the rate of fire and also will improve your clicking speed.

List of auto-clicker development tools

Windows
AutoIt
Macro Express
iMacros
thinBasic
Expect
AutoHotkey

macOS
 Automator

Linux
 AutoKey

Web-based
 Bookmarklet
 iMacros

See also
 Incremental games, which this software may be applied to

 Automation software